In enzymology, a glucuronate reductase is an enzyme that catalyzes the chemical reaction

L-gulonate + NADP+  D-glucuronate + NADPH + H+

Thus, the two substrates of this enzyme are L-gulonate and NADP+, whereas its 3 products are D-glucuronate, NADPH, and H+.

This enzyme belongs to the family of oxidoreductases, specifically those acting on the CH-OH group of donor with NAD+ or NADP+ as acceptor. The systematic name of this enzyme class is L-gulonate:NADP+ 6-oxidoreductase. Other names in common use include aldehyde reductase, L-hexonate:NADP dehydrogenase, TPN-L-gulonate dehydrogenase, aldehyde reductase II, NADP-L-gulonate dehydrogenase, D-glucuronate dehydrogenase, D-glucuronate reductase, and L-glucuronate reductase (incorrect). This enzyme participates in pentose and glucuronate interconversions and ascorbate and aldarate metabolism.

References

 
 Jakoby, W. B. (Ed.), Enzymatic Basis of Detoxication, vol. 1, Academic Press, New York, 1980, p. 249–260.
 

EC 1.1.1
NADPH-dependent enzymes
Enzymes of unknown structure